Jorge Aguirre may refer to
Jorge Aguirre (athlete), Mexican Olympic athlete
Jorge Aguirre (author), children's author
Jorge Aguirre (judoka) (born 1962), Argentine Olympic judoka
Jorge Aguirre (footballer, born 1987), Colombian footballer
Jorge Aguirre (footballer, born 2000), Spanish footballer